Daniela is a female given name and a variant of Danielle.

Daniela may also refer to:

 Daniela Alves Lima, a professional Brazilian footballer, commonly known as 'Daniela'
 Daniela (grape), another name for the Italian wine grape Prié blanc
 Daniela (moth), a moth genus
 Daniela (1976 TV series), a Venezuelan Spanish-language telenovela that aired on Venevisión
 Daniela (2002 TV series), an American-Mexican Spanish-language telenovela that aired on Telemundo
 MSC Daniela, a Panamanian-registered container ship